Daniel Michalski (born 11 January 2000) is a Polish tennis player.

Michalski has a career high ATP singles ranking of No. 243 achieved on 25 July 2022.

Michalski represents Poland at the Davis Cup, where he has a W/L record of 1–0.

ATP Challenger and ITF World Tennis Tour finals

Singles: 14 (8–6)

Doubles: 9 (4–5)

External links

2000 births
Living people
Polish male tennis players
Tennis players from Warsaw
Tennis players at the 2018 Summer Youth Olympics